The 2018 European Karate Championships were the 53rd edition of the European Karate Championships, and were held in Novi Sad, Serbia from 10 to 13 May 2018.

Medalists

Men

Women

Medal table

Participating nations 
532 athletes from 52 nations competed.

 (4)
 (1)
 (7)
 (13)
 (15)
 (12)
 (12)
 (15)
 (11)
 (16)
 (4)
 (9)
 (12)
 (14)
 (6)
 (12)
 (16)
 (13)
 (6)
 (14)
 (15)
 (14)
 (1)
 (10)
 (13)
 (15)
 (12)
 (1)
 (9)
 (2)
 (13)
 (1)
 (3)
 (15)
 (14)
 (1)
 (7)
 (15)
 (12)
 (16)
 (16)
 (1)
 (16)
 (5)
 (14)
 (11)
 (16)
 (8)
 (10)
 (16)
 (14)
 (4)

Para Karate 
The first Para-Karate European Championships was held May 10-13 in 2018. 43 athletes from 15 nations in 6 events was competed. Results:

References

External links
 World Karate Federation
 Results (Archived version)

European Championships, 2018
2018 in Serbian sport
2018
Karate Championships
Karate competitions in Serbia
Sport in Novi Sad
May 2018 sports events in Europe